Bruce Patane Altomari Yarnell (December 28, 1935 – November 30, 1973) was an American film, television, theatre actor and singer. He was known for playing the role of Deputy Marshal Chalk Breeson in the final season of the American western television series Outlaws. As a baritone, he performed in musicals such as Annie Get Your Gun, Bye Bye Birdie, Carousel, and Oklahoma!.

Life and career 
Yarnell was born in Pasadena, California, the son of Marie and Harold, a police officer. He was the older brother of dancer and actress Lorene Yarnell. He studied opera and later sang at the Earl Carroll Theatre in Los Angeles. He also sang in Reno, Nevada, where he was later joined by the Mormon Choir in numerous musical productions. Yarnell made his theatre debut in 1960 on Broadway, in Camelot as Sir Lionel.

His film and television career began soon afterwards, when he joined the cast of the western television series Outlaws in 1961, for its final season, playing the role of Deputy Marshal Chalk Breeson. That same year, he starred in the Broadway musical The Happiest Girl in the World as General Kinesias, for which he won the 1961 Theatre World Award. Yarnell continued to appear in films and television programs, including Irma la Douce (1963), Bonanza (1964–1965), and Hogan's Heroes (1965). He also starred as Billy Bigelow in the 1966 New York City Center Light Opera Company production of Carousel, as Frank E. Butler in the same year's Broadway revival of Annie Get Your Gun, as Curly McLain in the 1969 Little Theatre's production of Oklahoma! – both at the New York State Theater; and as Matt Reedy in the 1968 action film The Road Hustlers.

Yarnell later played leading roles at the San Francisco Opera House. His last credit was in a tour of Bye Bye Birdie at the Santa Monica Civic Auditorium in November 1973.

Personal life 
Yarnell's first wife was Frances Chadwick, a model; the two married on May 25, 1957. They divorced in March 1971 after having three daughters: Heather, Therese and Waverly. He then married Joan Patenaude, a soprano, on July 15, 1972.

Death 
Yarnell was a pilot and flew himself to his engagements. In the night of November 30, 1973, Yarnell was piloting a single‐engine plane from San Francisco to Hollywood Burbank Airport and crashed into a mountain slope near Gorman, California, northwest of Los Angeles. He died with his two passengers, Jerri and David Wirsching, a police officer from Burbank. His last message was that he had electrical power problems and became disoriented. Yarnell was interred in San Fernando Mission Cemetery.

Legacy 
In 1979, Yarnell's second wife, Joan, created an award called the "Bruce Yarnell Memorial Award", given by Opera Philadelphia to an outstanding baritone, bass‐baritone or bass.

References

External links 
 
 
 
 
 

1935 births
1973 deaths
20th-century American male actors
20th-century American male singers
20th-century American singers
Accidental deaths in California
American baritones
American male film actors
American male musical theatre actors
American male stage actors
American male television actors
Aviators killed in aviation accidents or incidents in the United States
Burials at San Fernando Mission Cemetery
Male actors from Pasadena, California
Musicians from Pasadena, California
Musicians killed in aviation accidents or incidents
Singers from California
Theatre World Award winners
Victims of aviation accidents or incidents in 1973
Western (genre) television actors